Enrico Maria Malatesta (born 25 March 1976) is an Italian professional footballer who plays as a goalkeeper.

On 30 March 2012 he was signed by Cremonese.

References

External links
 

1976 births
Living people
Italian footballers
S.S.D. Pro Sesto players
U.S. Alessandria Calcio 1912 players
A.C. Legnano players
F.C. Pro Vercelli 1892 players
Como 1907 players
Association football goalkeepers